Bukovce is a village and municipality in Stropkov District in the Prešov Region of north-eastern Slovakia.

History
In historical records the village was first mentioned in 1379.

Geography
The municipality lies at an altitude of 239 metres and covers an area of 11.062 km². It has a population of about 562 people.

Demographics
According to the 2001 census, 52.6% were Slovak and 47.4% Rusyn. In the same census, religion in Bukovce is composed 92.1% Greek Catholic, 5.3% Orthodox and 2.6% Roman Catholic.

Genealogical resources

The records for genealogical research are available at the state archive "Statny Archiv in Presov, Slovakia"
 Roman Catholic church records (births/marriages/deaths): 1700-1897 (parish B)
 Greek Catholic church records (births/marriages/deaths): 1851-1897 (parish A)

See also
 List of municipalities and towns in Slovakia

References

External links
 
 
https://web.archive.org/web/20071217080336/http://www.statistics.sk/mosmis/eng/run.html
Surnames of living people in Bukovce

Villages and municipalities in Stropkov District